Orvanne was a short-lived commune in the department of Seine-et-Marne in north-central France. The commune was established on 1 January 2015 by merger of the former communes of Écuelles and Moret-sur-Loing. On 1 January 2016, it was merged into the new commune Moret-Loing-et-Orvanne.

See also 
Communes of the Seine-et-Marne department

References 

Former communes of Seine-et-Marne